This is a list of museums in Kuwait:
 Kuwait National Cultural District
 Sheikh Abdullah Al Salem Cultural Centre
 Al Salam Palace
 Habitat Museum at Al Shaheed Park
 Remembrance Museum at Al Shaheed Park
 Bait Al-Othman Museum
 Ahmad Al-Jaber Oil and Gas Museum
 Qibla Cultural District
 Sadu House
 National Museum of Kuwait
 Bait al-Bader
 Museum of Modern Art
 Kuwait Maritime Museum
 Tareq Rajab Museum 
 Tareq Rajab Museum of Islamic Calligraphy (Dar Jehan)
 Al Qurain Martyr's Museum
 Historical, Vintage, and Classical Cars Museum 
 Amricani Cultural Centre
 Dickson House 
 Yarmouk Cultural Centre
 House of Mirrors 
 Failaka Museum
 Jahra Red Palace Museum
 Municipal Museum
 History of Education Museum (Mubarakiya School)
 Kuwait Scientific Center
 Alaujairy's Astronomical Museum
 Kuwait House of National Works: Memorial Museum 
 Kuwait Science and Natural History Museum 
 Al-Hashemi Marine Museum
 Fateh Al-Khayr
 Kuwait Ceramics House (Bait Ghaith)
 Saud Al-Turaiji Museum
 Bait Alhusainan
 Kuwait Air Force Museum
 Hassan Ashkanani Museum
 Hamed Al Fuzaia Museum
 Saif Marzooq Al-Shamlan Museum
 Kuwait Police Museum
 Mubarak Kiosk
 Various museums at Youm Al Bahar Village
 Al-Asfoor Museum
 National Bank of Kuwait Museum
 Museum of Archaeology and Anthropology at Kuwait University
 Islamic Antiquities Museum of Kuwait

References

External links 

Museums
 
Entertainment venues in Kuwait
Museums
Kuwait
Kuwait